Coughtry is a surname. Notable people with the surname include:

 Graham Coughtry (1931–1999), Canadian painter
 Marlan Coughtry (1934–2016), American baseball player

See also
 Coughtrie